Jani Lauzon (born September 29, 1959) is a Canadian puppeteer and musician of Métis heritage from East Kootenay, British Columbia.  She is a three-time Juno Award Nominee with Muppet Show credits that include additional puppetry on Follow That Bird, performing on The Jim Henson Hour, and a cat in the Sesame Street Canada television special "Basil Hears a Noise".

Her other non-Henson credits include Maggie on Groundling Marsh and regular roles on The Big Comfy Couch, The Longhouse Tales, Alligator Pie, Happy Castle, Prairie Berry Pie, Mr. Dressup, Wumpa's World, Little Star and Iris the Happy Professor.

Lauzon has also appeared on camera in TV and movies such as Code Name: Eternity, Conspiracy of Silence, Business Management, Maggie's Life, Bingo Road, Destiny Ridge, and Ruby and the Well.

She was worked as a radio actress on several radio stations including CBC Radio. In 2012, she performed a dual role as Cordelia and the Fool in an all-aboriginal production of William Shakespeare's King Lear at the National Arts Centre in Ottawa, alongside a cast that also included August Schellenberg as Lear, Tantoo Cardinal as Regan, Billy Merasty as Gloucester and Craig Lauzon as Kent.

Lauzon resides in Toronto, Ontario.

Discography 
Blue Voice/New Voice (1994/2000) RA Records, distributor Indiepool
Hearts of the Nations (1997) The Banff Centre/Sweet Grass
Thirst (1998) RA Records
Heartbeat 2: More Voices of First Nations Women (1998) Smithsonian Folkways
Contemporary Native American Music (2006)
Mixed Blessings (2007)

References

External links
Article on Jani Lauzon by the Toronto Blues Society

1959 births
Living people
Canadian puppeteers
Canadian television actresses
Canadian film actresses
Canadian radio actresses
Canadian blues singers
Musicians from British Columbia
Métis musicians
First Nations actresses
Canadian stage actresses
20th-century Canadian women singers
21st-century Canadian women singers
Canadian Métis people